São João da Baliza is a municipality located in the southeast of the state of Roraima in Brazil. Its population is 8,348 (2020) and its area is 4,284 km2. São João da Baliza was first settled in 1974 after the BR-210 highway made the area accessible. It was called São João, because three of the initial settlers were called João. Da Baliza refers to a stream near the town. It became an independent municipality in 1982.

References

External links
 Official website (in Portuguese)
 

Municipalities in Roraima